Stephen Black (born 5 April 1980) is an Australian former professional basketball player who played 11 seasons in the National Basketball League (NBL). He is the son of Alan Black.

Born in Melbourne, Victoria, Black attended the Australian Institute of Sport (AIS) in Canberra in 1998 and 1999. He made his debut in the NBL in October 1998, playing his first five seasons with the Perth Wildcats. He joined the Brisbane Bullets in 2003 and then the Cairns Taipans in 2007. He retired in 2009 having played 298 NBL games. His final season in the NBL was cut short by a back injury.

In 2010, Black coached the South West Metro Pirates in the Queensland Basketball League.

In April 2016, Black replaced his father as head coach of the Willetton Tigers in the State Basketball League. He parted ways with the Tigers in September 2020.

References

External links
Italian League profile
Coaching Willetton the fit that suits Black perfectly

1980 births
Living people
Australian men's basketball players
Australian Institute of Sport basketball players
Brisbane Bullets players
Pallacanestro Biella players
Perth Wildcats players
Point guards
Shooting guards
Basketball players from Melbourne